Kong (also Romanized as Kung and Gong; also known as Bandar-e Gong and Bandar-e Kong) is a city in the Central District of Bandar Lengeh County, Hormozgan Province, Iran. At the 2006 census, its population was 14,881, in 2,908 families.

References 

Populated places in Bandar Lengeh County
Cities in Hormozgan Province